Allips concolor is a species of eel in the family Ophichthidae. The only member of its genus, it is found in the eastern Indian Ocean in shallow waters around Thailand and Australia.

References

Ophichthidae
Fish described in 1972